Mentzer is an unincorporated community in Hardin County, in the U.S. state of Ohio.

History
Mentzer had a clay works at a railroad siding.

References

Unincorporated communities in Hardin County, Ohio
Unincorporated communities in Ohio